Damià Viader Masdeu (born 19 February 1998) is a Spanish footballer who plays as a defender for Sacramento Republic in the USL Championship.

Career

Union Omaha
After joining the club prior to the 2020 season, Viader made his debut on 25 July 2020 against New England Revolution II.

Sacramento Republic
On 2 March 2022, Viader signed with USL Championship side Sacramento Republic.

References

External links
Damià Viader at Iowa Western CC Athletics

1998 births
Living people
Union Omaha players
USL League One players
Spanish footballers
Association football defenders
Footballers from Barcelona
Spanish expatriate footballers
Spanish expatriate sportspeople in the United States
Expatriate soccer players in the United States
National Premier Soccer League players
Sacramento Republic FC players